Jolanda or Jolande is a feminine given name. It is a Dutch, Italian, and Swiss German cognate of Yolanda. Notable people with the name include:

Jolanda

Jolanda Adams, Actress

Jolanda Benvenuti, Italian film editor
Jolanda Čeplak (born 1976), Slovenian middle-distance athlete
Jolanda De Palma (born 1931), Italian singer
Jolanda Di Fiore (1935–2004), Italian actress known as Maria Fiore
Jolanda van Dongen (born 1966), Dutch cyclist
Jolanda Egger (born 1960), Swiss model
Jolanda Elshof (born 1975), Dutch volleyball player
Jolanda Insana (1937–2016), Italian poet
Jolanda Jetten (born 1970), Dutch psychologist
Jolanda Jones (born 1959), American heptathlete
Jolanda Keizer (born 1985), Dutch heptathlete
Jolanda Kindle (born 1965), Liechtenstein skier
Jolanda Kodra (1910–1963), Albanian writer and translator,
Jolanda Kroesen (born 1979), Dutch softball player
Jolanda Neff (born 1993), Swiss cyclist
Jolanda Annen (born 1992), Swiss triathlete
Jolanda Plank (born 1958), Italian skier
Jolanda de Rover (born 1963), Dutch swimmer
Jolanda Slenter (born 1965), Dutch sitting volleyball player
Jolande
Jolande Jacobi (1890–1973), Swiss psychologist
Jolande Jobin (1930–2010), Swiss figure skater
Jolande van der Meer (born 1964), Dutch swimmer
Jolande Sap (born 1963), Dutch GreenLeft politician

See also
Jolanda di Savoia, comune (municipality) in the Province of Ferrara in the Italian region Emilia-Romagna
Jolanta

Dutch feminine given names
Given names derived from plants or flowers
Italian feminine given names
Swiss feminine given names